Today Forever is an EP by British rock band Ride, released in March 1991.

The first three songs also appeared in the US on the "Vapour Trail" CD-single. All four songs from the EP were added to the Nowhere album as bonus tracks on its re-release in 2001, 20th anniversary reissue in 2011, and 25th anniversary reissue in 2015.

In November 2022, all four songs were made available on ‘4EPs’, a compilation of Ride’s first four EPs made available together for the first time and packaged as one gatefold album on white vinyl and in CD format.

Track listing

Video album

In 1991, a video album was released to accompany the EP, featuring a music video for each song directed by James Deegan. The release was also made available in Japan on Laserdisc as part of a box set with the band's Brixton live video. This version was a compilation of all of the band's music videos up to that point.

Track listing

References

External links

Ride (band) albums
1991 EPs
Creation Records EPs